The 2006 Fujitsu V8 Supercar Series was an Australian motor racing series for V8 Supercars. It was the seventh annual V8 Supercar Development Series. It began on 24 March 2006 at Adelaide Street Circuit and finished on 10 December at Phillip Island Grand Prix Circuit after seven rounds held across four different states.

The series was dominated by a single driver, with Howard Racing Ford Falcon driver Adam Macrow winning eight of the 18 races and five of the seven rounds. Dick Johnson Racing Ford Falcon driver Andrew Thompson won the remaining two rounds, including three race wins. An inconsistent start to the series saw him only eighth in the pointscore which placed a heavy emphasis on finishing over winning. Young Perkins Motorsport Holden Commodore drivers Shane Price and Jack Perkins finished second and third in the series, with Price taking two race wins. The only other multiple race winner was Kayne Scott who won two reverse grid races.

The series was marred by a fatal accident at the Mount Panorama round where David Clark crashed into the stationary car of Mark Porter. Clark was seriously injured in the collision while Porter died in the Royal Prince Alfred Hospital two days after the accident.

Race calendar

Teams and drivers
A record number of competitors took part in the 2006 series with the Queensland Raceway round over-subscribed with 41 cars entering, forcing the slowest qualifiers to sit out the racing. 
 The following teams and drivers have competed during the 2006 Fujitsu V8 Supercar Series:

Points system
The series consisted of seven rounds across four different states. Rounds 2, 3, 4 and 5 consisted of three races each. The second race of each weekend saw the finishing order of race 1 reversed to form the grid for a 'reverse grid' race. Point allocated for the reverse grid race were worth half as much as were the first and third races of these rounds. Rounds 1, 6 and 7 each consisted of two races.

Points were awarded for cars who finished in the top 32 race positions in each race according to finishing order. With cars finishing races as low as 37th, there were numerous occasions during the season were cars did not receive points for finishing races.

Series standings 
Points table referenced, in part, as follows:

References

External links
 2006 Racing Results Archive 
 Series Points Report, racing.natsoft.com.au, as archived at web.archive.org

See also
 2006 V8 Supercar season

Fujitsu
Supercars Development Series